Ahmed sayed (born 23 February 2002) is an Egyptian professional footballer who plays as a forward for ZED on loan from Al Ahly.

Club career
On 7 August 2022 Ahmed scored two goals against Al Ittihad Alexandria on his league debut.

Career statistics

Club

Notes

References

2002 births
Living people
Footballers from Cairo
Egyptian footballers
Association football midfielders
Egyptian Premier League players
Al Ahly SC players